This is a list of films about the Romanovs, the ruling family of Russia from 1613 to 1917. There have been many films about the Romanovs, so this list may be incomplete.

1890s

1910s

1920s

1930s

1940s

1950s

1960s

1970s

1980s

1990s

2000s

2010s 

Romanovs
Romanovs